The Webster Street station was a train station located at Webster and North 15th Streets in Omaha, Nebraska, United States. Located on the Omaha Belt Line, which was operated by the Omaha Road and the Missouri Pacific Railroad as a local railroad passenger depot, the station was built in 1887. In 1902 the New York Times noted the station for its innovations in the treatment of passenger luggage.

The Swedes in Omaha used the Webster Street Station to connect with their ethnic communities in Oakland, Pender, Wakefield, and Wausa.

References

Former railway stations in Omaha, Nebraska
Railway stations in the United States opened in 1887
Omaha
Omaha